Bulk transfer may refer to:
 Bulk sale, an ownership transfer of inventory to another company
 Bulk transport, the transportation of bulk cargo